The 1978 Chilean International Championships was a men's tennis tournament played on outdoor clay courts in Santiago, Chile that was part of the Grand Prix tennis circuit. It was the third edition of the tournament and was held from 27 November through 3 December 1978. Third-seeded José Luis Clerc won the singles title.

Finals

Singles
 José Luis Clerc defeated  Víctor Pecci 3–6, 6–3, 6–1
 It was Clerc's 3rd singles title of the year and of his career.

Doubles
 Hans Gildemeister /  Víctor Pecci defeated  Álvaro Fillol /  Jaime Fillol 6–4, 6–3

References

External links
 ITF tournament edition details

Chilean International
1978 in Chilean sport